James Ervin (October 17, 1778 – July 7, 1841) was a U.S. Representative from South Carolina.

Early life

Born in Williamsburg District, Ervin was graduated from Rhode Island College (now Brown University), in 1797.  He studied law and was admitted to the bar in 1800.  He commenced practice in the Pee Dee.

Career

He served as member of the State house of representatives from 1800–1804 and from 1810-1811.  He then served as solicitor of the northern judicial circuit 1804–1816.  He was a trustee of South Carolina College from 1809–1817.

Ervin was elected as a Democratic-Republican to the Fifteenth Congress and reelected to the Sixteenth Congress (March 4, 1817 – March 3, 1821).  He declined to be a candidate for renomination in 1820.

After his tenure in Congress, he engaged in agricultural pursuits.  He later served as member of the State senate from 1826-1829.  He was a delegate to the State convention in 1832.

He died in Darlington, South Carolina, July 7, 1841 and was interred at his home.

Sources

1778 births
1841 deaths
Brown University alumni
Democratic-Republican Party members of the United States House of Representatives from South Carolina